Valanga is a genus of "bird grasshoppers" in the subfamily Cyrtacanthacridinae. Species are found from the Indian subcontinent through southeast Asia and the Korean peninsula to Australia and the Pacific islands.

Species
The Orthoptera Species File lists the following Valanga species:
Valanga cheesmanae Uvarov, 1932
Valanga chloropus Sjöstedt, 1932
Valanga coerulescens Willemse, 1953
Valanga conspersa Uvarov, 1923
Valanga excavata Stål, 1861
Valanga fakfakensis Sjöstedt, 1932
Valanga geniculata Stål, 1877
Valanga gilbertensis Willemse, 1970
Valanga gohieri Le Guillou, 1841
Valanga ilocano Rehn & Rehn, 1941
Valanga irregularis Walker, 1870
Valanga isolata Willemse, 1955
Valanga marquesana Uvarov, 1927
Valanga meleager Sjöstedt, 1921
Valanga modesta Sjöstedt, 1921
Valanga nigricornis (Burmeister, 1838) - type species (as Acridium nigricorne = V. nigricornis nigricornis)
Valanga nobilis Sjöstedt, 1930
Valanga papuasica Finot, 1907
Valanga pulchripes Sjöstedt, 1921
Valanga rapana Uvarov, 1927
Valanga renschi Ramme, 1941
Valanga rouxi Willemse, 1923
Valanga rubrispinarum Sjöstedt, 1936
Valanga salomonica Sjöstedt, 1932
Valanga sjostedti Uvarov, 1923
Valanga soror Sjöstedt, 1936
Valanga stercoraria Holdhaus, 1909
Valanga tenimberensis Sjöstedt, 1930
Valanga transiens Walker, 1870
Valanga uvarovia Willemse, 1955
Valanga willemsei Sjöstedt, 1932

References

External links
 
 

Acrididae genera
Taxa named by Boris Uvarov
Cyrtacanthacridinae